"Fire" is a song by the British singer Sean Smith. It was written by Charlie Mason and Daniel Volpe (Daniel also produced it).
The single was Sean's third solo single after signing to Energise Records. The track was released on 2 November 2017. The remix EP which featured remixes by Ricardo Autobahn & FNK'D UP DJ. It reached number 4 on the UK iTunes vocal album chart.

Recording
The track was recorded at The Old Blacksmiths Studios in Portsmouth with the vocals engineered by Ben Whyntie. Sean's manager Stefan Pellett was also present at the recording.

Critical response
My Fizzy Pop commented "He takes you on a dark, seductive journey that unveils a hitherto hidden side of Sean - his ability to take on a character to bring a frisson of dangerous excitement into his lyrical, melodic tale".

Jonathan Currinn wrote on Celebmix "The song is more of an emotional ballad – a side we haven't heard from Sean Smith just yet. "Fire" really exposes his vocals and his ability to flood the lyrics with emotions; and, that is exactly what he does. This song clearly means a lot to this male artist, and he has truly connected with the lyrics".

Bill C's Music Blog quoted "It starts off quiet and mysterious and lingers a bit before making its point. Sean's diverse vocal makes a fine song even that much better".

EQ Music Blog quoted "Sean is thoughtfully plotting his comeback one track at a time and evolving with a notch more credibility on every release".

Chart performance
The EP reached number 4 on the UK iTunes vocal album chart. The single peaked at number 20 on the UK iTunes vocal singles chart.

Music video
An official lyric video was released on 2 November 2017.

Remixes
The EP featured remixes by Ricardo Autobahn and FNK'D UP DJ.

Formats and track listings

UK CD single
 "Fire " – 3:32
 "Fire (Ricardo Autobahn Edit)" – 3:29
 "Fire (FNK'D UP DJ Edit)" – 3:21
 "Fire (Ricardo Autobahn Remix)" – 5:05
 "Fire (FNK'D UP DJ Extended Mix)" – 4:29

Digital single
 "Fire " – 3:32
 "Fire (Ricardo Autobahn Edit)" – 3:29
 "Fire (FNK'D UP DJ Edit)" – 3:21
 "Fire (Ricardo Autobahn Remix)" – 5:05
 "Fire (FNK'D UP DJ Extended Mix)" – 4:29

References

External links

2017 songs
2017 singles
Songs with lyrics by Charlie Mason (lyricist)